Heartland of America Park is a public park located at 800 Douglas Street in downtown Omaha, Nebraska. It has been closed for renovations since 2019 and will not reopen until 2023. The  park is situated between Interstate 80 and the Missouri River, and is adjacent to Gene Leahy Mall and the Old Market and connects to Lewis & Clark Landing. Where the park sits has been the site of exploration, expansion and now, recreation. Lewis and Clark reportedly discovered conspicuous earthen mounds when they explored the location in 1804. Historians speculate the mounds may have been natural or the remains of an Otoe village. Opened in 1990, the park was built on  recovered after the controversial demolition of the Jobbers Canyon Historic District. The area, filled with warehouses dating to the 1870s, was integral to the growth and development of Omaha.

About
Along with the lake the park features a paved walking trail encircling area. There are three fountains, including a large, modern, $1.5 million computerized fountain that projects water  into the air and features a nighttime light show. The lake has a tour boat named the General Marion, with rides available in the summertime, and resident swans named Romeo and Juliet in honor of the play. There is also a monument to the 1898 Trans-Mississippi Exposition, and the late 1800s Waterworks Fountain, once located at the Webster Station, a railroad depot in North Omaha. The park is the site of the annual Taste of Omaha event.

ConAgra Foods is located on the south end of the lake, and recently, after initially cutting off access to the south end of the park, ConAgra opened the walking path all the way around the lake.

If you stay on the path around the lake, and cut through underneath the structural awning on the northwest side of the lake, the total distance around is .96 miles.

See also
 Parks in Omaha, Nebraska

References

External links
 Modern photo of the Waterworks Fountain
 jpg of water fountain in the park

Parks in Omaha, Nebraska
1990 establishments in Nebraska